is a railway station in the city of Toyota, Aichi Prefecture, Japan, operated by the third sector Aichi Loop Railway Company.

Lines

Station layout
The station has two elevated side platforms, with the station building located underneath. The station building has automated ticket machines, TOICA automated turnstiles and is staffed.

Platforms

Adjacent stations

Station history
Shin-Toyota Station was opened on April 26, 1976 as a passenger station on the Japan National Railways (JNR) Okata Line connecting  with Shin-Toyota. With the privatization of the JNR on April 1, 1987, the station came under control of JR Central. The station was transferred to the Aichi Loop Railway Company on January 31, 1988. The station building was rebuilt in 1991.

Passenger statistics
In fiscal 2017, the station was used by an average of 14,915 passengers daily.

Surrounding area
 Toyota City Hall
 Toyota Municipal Museum of Art

See also
 List of railway stations in Japan

References

External links

Official home page 

Railway stations in Japan opened in 1976
Railway stations in Aichi Prefecture
Toyota, Aichi